Hirschland is a commune in the Bas-Rhin department in Grand Est in north-eastern France.

Hirschland is some twelve kilometres (seven miles) to the northwest of Phalsbourg, beside the autoroute towards Sarre-Union and, further to the west, Metz.

See also
 Communes of the Bas-Rhin department

References

Communes of Bas-Rhin
Bas-Rhin communes articles needing translation from French Wikipedia